Hapuakohe Range of hills is aligned north-south, between the Waikato River and the Hauraki Plains in the Waikato region of New Zealand. It is separated from the Taupiri Range by an air-gap at Mangawara, where the Waikato flowed about 20,000 years ago.

The range is drained by the Waitakaruru and Whangamarino Rivers and their tributaries at the north end. Further south, tributaries of the Piako River drain the east side of the range and streams flow to the Waikato on the west.

The 1865 confiscation boundary ran along the range. The boundary between Waikato and Ohinemuri (from 1920 Hauraki Plains) counties followed a similar line, as does the current boundary between Waikato, Hauraki and Matamata Piako Districts.

Named summits and road 
From north to south, the features named on the LINZ map are:

 Pukekamaka 
 Okaeria 
 Karamuroa 
 Otane 
 Ikeike  - west of main ridge – a low priority walkway plan may link them.
Matahuru Rd  - in 2007 the lower part of the road averaged 61 vehicles a day.
There is also a  Maungakawa hill near Cambridge.
 Pukeitionga 
 Tirotiro  (east of main ridge)
 Maukoro  (east of main ridge)
 Pororua  (west of main ridge)
 Hapuakohe 
 Ngaraparapa 
 Te Hoe  – Te Hoe pā, with terraces, scarps and pits, was used by Ngāti Wairere and Ngāti Hauā.
 Tauwhare 
 Te Heru 
 Puketutu Pā 
 Ruakiwi Pā

Geology 
As shown on this GNS map, the Hapuakohe Range is mainly formed of greywacke of the Jurassic Manaia Hill Group (shown as Jm on map). Overlain with volcanic ash, they've mainly formed clay podzol soils, with poor drainage, which are prone to sheet erosion, particularly on grazed, steep land.

Cenozoic intrusive rocks surface at either end of the range; Tahuna unit (Mkt) at the south end is 6–7 Ma basaltic andesite and pyroxene andesite, with eroded remnants of lava flows and volcanic breccias. Miranda Unit (Mkm), at the north end, is 13–10 Ma, also of basaltic and pyroxene andesite, but including dacite, tuff and hornblende.

Hapuakohe Walkway 

There is a  Department of Conservation walkway along the range, allowing excellent views of Mt Te Aroha, Firth of Thames, Huntly power station, hill country south of Auckland and the Waikato Plains.

Ecology 
The Hapuakohe Range includes Hapuakohe Conservation and Ecological areas, Mangapiko Valley and Matahuru scenic reserves, the southern  being protected since 1906 under the 1903 Scenery Preservation Act.

The natural vegetation was kauri forest, often mixed with podocarps, and, at the southern end, with hard beech, with rimu–tawa forest at higher levels and kahikatea on the flood plains. Tanekaha, rewarewa, mingimingi, prickly mingimingi, silver fern, wheki, kanuka and puriri are also common and there is some taraire. All the large kauri trees have been logged, but now about 42% of the native vegetation is protected from clearance, some 58% of the rest being kanuka and manuka scrubland, mainly on the eastern foothills.

No detailed survey of native animals seems to have been done. Kererū and copper skinks are present. Longtailed bats, NZ falcon, Hochstetter's and Archey's frogs, forest gecko and green geckos are likely to be in the Range. Until the 1980s kokako were in the area, but thought to be locally extinct now, though numbers have recovered in the Hunua Ranges to the north.

References

Mountain ranges of Waikato
Hills of New Zealand
Waikato District
Hauraki District